Robinson's tree frog (Leptomantis robinsonii) is a species of frog in the family Rhacophoridae found in Malaysia and Thailand.
Its natural habitats are subtropical or tropical moist lowland forests and intermittent freshwater marshes.
It is threatened by habitat loss.

References

External links
Amphibian and Reptiles of Peninsular Malaysia - Rhacophorus robinsonii

Leptomantis
Amphibians described in 1903
Taxonomy articles created by Polbot
Taxobox binomials not recognized by IUCN